The 2009–10 Abu Dhabi 2nd GP2 Asia round was the second round of the 2009-10 GP2 Asia Series season. It was held on February 5 and 6, 2010 at Yas Marina Circuit at Abu Dhabi, United Arab Emirates. It is the second of two rounds to be held at the circuit, the other being the 2009-10 Abu Dhabi 1st GP2 Asia round. The next race of the season will be at Bahrain International Circuit, Sakhir, Bahrain and will be the first round to be held at the circuit of the season.

Report

Race 1 
Charles Pic started on pole for Race 1. The feature race was won by Oliver Turvey, claiming his first GP2 Asia victory by leading home teammate Davide Valsecchi in an iSport one-two at Yas Marina. Formula 3 Euroseries champion Jules Bianchi began his GP2 career with third for ART, with the charging Luca Filippi coming through to fourth from the back of the grid for Meritus only to retire on the last lap and hand the place to Arden's Javier Villa. Poleman Charles Pic (Arden) had a disastrous race, starting when Turvey burst ahead off the line and Valsecchi surged down the inside to claim second at the end of the long back straight. The top three then settled down in close company, with Bianchi and Villa following them. The latter kickstarted the lead group's early pitstops by coming in for tyres on lap six - and then set a new fastest lap on fresh rubber, prompting the rest of the frontrunners to stop in quick succession. Turvey was the last of this pack to pit on lap 10, emerging right in front of Valsecchi. The championship leader immediately attacked, going around the outside into the Turn 11/12/13 complex and nosing ahead. The two iSport cars banged wheels as they turned in and skittered over the run-off, rejoining still first and second but now with Villa, Bianchi and Pic - who had lost ground on the out-laps - right on their tails. Turvey wasted no time in fighting back, sweeping around the outside of Valsecchi with a brilliant move at the penultimate corner just moments after he had lost the lead. In their wake, Bianchi pulled off an identical pass to take third from Villa.

As the tyres came up to temperature, the frenetic racing calmed down, with Turvey leading Valsecchi, Bianchi, Villa and the flying Filippi. The Meritus driver had made spectacular progress from the back of the grid following his troubled Thursday, but also sent Pic flying across a run-off area and down the order with an aggressive move near half-distance. Although Valsecchi remained on Turvey's tail, the Briton could not be parted from the lead again - even when the safety car was called to retrieve Alberto Valerio's stalled Coloni car in the closing stages. Turvey ultimately beat Valsecchi across the line by 0.6s, with Bianchi close behind and Villa promoted to fourth and DPR's Giacomo Ricci to fifth when Filippi's car ground to a halt with a lap to go. American Alexander Rossi - who also had to start at the back - provided some consolation for Meritus by surging through to sixth. He looked set for eighth and race two pole for a while, until Addax's Giedo van der Garde crashed out of seventh place. That accident handed eighth to Marcus Ericsson, but DPR driver Michael Herck's bid to pass the Super Nova driver left Ericsson with broken suspension, so it was Ocean's Max Chilton who found himself scoring the final point and picking up Saturday pole once Filippi's late retirement elevated the remaining finishers. Christian Vietoris - a winner in the previous event at Yas Marina three months ago - had to retire following a tangle with Trident's Plamen Kralev as he tried to pass the backmarker after his pitstop. Vietoris' DAMS teammate Edoardo Piscopo's race was even shorter as he was involved in one of several opening lap incidents. ART's Sam Bird was the other main lap one casualty, being spun to the back and then having contact with Herck and a solo spin before retiring. Another frontrunner out of luck was Sergio Pérez (Addax), who ran sixth until stalling in the pits and then having to make an additional stop.

Race 2 
Max Chilton started on Pole for the Sprint Race after finishing 8th in Race 1, and therefore gaining the reverse grid pole. Davide Valsecchi extended his GP2 Asia lead by denying Michael Herck victory with a late pass in the second Abu Dhabi race. Until the closing stages, Herck and his teammate Giacomo Ricci had looked set to give their DPR team a shock one-two - four and a half years after the squad's last wins. But Valsecchi mounted a last gasp charge to pass both Ricci and Herck in quick succession and claim his iSport squad's second win of the weekend. Outside front row starter Herck had taken the lead at the start, with Ricci passing Alexander Rossi (Meritus) for second at a safety car restart shortly afterwards. Valsecchi made rapid progress from seventh on the grid and was soon in third behind the two DPR cars. But until the final half dozen laps, Herck and Ricci looked comfortable up front. The points leader had speed in reserve, though, and in the final laps Valsecchi increased his pace and piled pressure on Ricci, eventually making it through with an inventive move that required several corners to complete. He then hunted down Herck and dived down the inside at the end of the back straight on the penultimate lap, before pulling away to win by 1.9s - giving him a 19-point championship lead at the series' halfway point.

Herck and Ricci held on to the remaining podium places, with Addax's Sergio Pérez charging from the midfield through to fourth. Pérez escaped serious damage in the opening lap tangle that caused the early safety car - the Mexican and Josef Kral touching, and sending the Super Nova car bouncing into Meritus' Luca Filippi. Friday winner Oliver Turvey took the second iSport car to fifth, having spent much of the race behind polesitter Max Chilton (Ocean). The Formula 3 graduate lost ground on lap one but then held his own among the frontrunners and resisted ART's Jules Bianchi - who scorched through the field after stalling on the grid - and Arden's Charles Pic to score the final point. Pic's teammate Javier Villa was another man to stall at the start, while Addax's Giedo van der Garde was making progress through the group behind Chilton until he tangled with Fabio Leimer (Ocean).

Classification

Qualifying

Race 1

References

2010 in Emirati motorsport
GP2 Asia Series